Acebrochol (INN), also known as cholesteryl acetate dibromide or 5α,6β-dibromocholestan-3β-ol acetate, is a neuroactive steroid which was described as a sedative and hypnotic but was never marketed.

Chemistry

See also
 Allopregnanolone
 Ganaxolone
 Hydroxydione
 Progesterone

References

Cholestanes
Hypnotics
Sedatives
Neurosteroids
Acetate esters
GABAA receptor positive allosteric modulators